Vanwyksvlei Dam is a dam in South Africa. It was established in 1884.

See also
List of reservoirs and dams in South Africa

References 

 List of South African Dams from the Department of Water Affairs and Forestry (South Africa)

Dams in South Africa
Dams completed in 1884
19th-century architecture in South Africa